Dave Wright (born May 16, 1985) is an American poet, writer, and publisher. He is the author of one book of poems titled Riverwalkers, and one chapbook of poems titled Pixels, which was published by Reality Hands in 2014. He lives in Dickson, TN and Sewanee, Tennessee during the summer, where he attends the Sewanee School of Letters at Sewanee: The University of the South. He is the founder and Editor-in-Chief of indie publishing company Dig That Book Co., LLC.

Life
Wright grew up on a farm in Dickson, TN. He attended undergraduate school at Tennessee Technological University, where he earned a BS in Communication Sciences. He is currently pursuing an MFA in Fiction at Sewanee School of Letters in Sewanee, Tennessee. He is a member of The Porch Writer's Collective in Nashville, TN.

Work
Wright's work has been featured in The Dead Mule School of Southern Literature, Black Heart Magazine, Best of Black Heart 2014, The Newer York, HUSMW, Cutty Spot Interviews, Calliope Magazine, The Caper Literary Journal's Anthology VWA: Poems for Haiti

He was the featured poet at East Side Storytellin' #42: Where The River Life Ran Through Us All, a popular reading and music series in East Nashville.

Dig That Book Co., LLC
Wright founded the independent publishing company Dig That Book Co. in August 2013.

List of current titles:
#urananimal by Nicholas Spence
Furthest Agent by D.C DeMarse
It Doesn't Matter What You Look Like On The Outside It's What's On The Internet That Counts by Beach Sloth
I Will Always Be in Love by Alexandra Naughton
The End of the World by Megan Lent
The Ghosts That Surrounded Them by Timmy Reed (Winner of the 2015 Baker Artist Grant)

Forthcoming titles:
NUMBSKULL by No Glykon 
Taco Jehovah by Josh Spilker

Bibliography
Riverwalkers (poems, Dig That Book Co. 2013)
Pixels (poems, Reality Hands, 2014)

References

External links
Dig That Book Co., LLC
Riverwalkers

American male poets
Living people
Tennessee Technological University
Sewanee: The University of the South
1985 births
People from Dickson, Tennessee
People from Sewanee, Tennessee
21st-century American poets
21st-century American male writers